Colasposoma madoni is a species of leaf beetle of Senegal, described by Maurice Pic in 1942.

References

madoni
Beetles of Africa
Taxa named by Maurice Pic
Insects of West Africa
Beetles described in 1942